New Soil is an album by American saxophonist Jackie McLean recorded in 1959 and released on the Blue Note label. It features McLean's quintet with trumpeter Donald Byrd, pianist Walter Davis Jr., bassist Paul Chambers and drummer Pete La Roca.

Reception

The Allmusic review by Steve Huey stated: "New Soil wasn't the first session Jackie McLean recorded for Blue Note, but it was the first one released, and as the title suggests, the first glimmerings of McLean's desire to push beyond the limits of bop are already apparent... It could be argued that McLean never recorded a bad album for Blue Note, and New Soil got his career with the label off to a terrifically stimulating start".

Track listing
All compositions by Walter Davis Jr., except as indicated.
 "Hip Strut" (Jackie McLean) - 11:20
 "Minor Apprehension" (McLean) - 7:34
 "Greasy" - 7:25
 "Sweet Cakes" - 6:46
 "Davis Cup" - 5:26
 "Formidable" - 6:16 Bonus track on 1988 CD reissue

Personnel
Jackie McLean - alto saxophone
Donald Byrd - trumpet
Walter Davis Jr. - piano
Paul Chambers - bass
Pete LaRoca - drums

References

Blue Note Records albums
Jackie McLean albums
1959 albums
Albums produced by Alfred Lion
Albums recorded at Van Gelder Studio